Lynn Justine Rothschild  (born May 11, 1957) is an evolutionary biologist and astrobiologist at NASA's Ames Research Center, and was a consulting Professor at Stanford University, where she taught Astrobiology and Space Exploration. She is an adjunct professor at Brown University. At Ames, her research has focused on how life, particularly microbes, has evolved in the context of the physical environment, both on Earth and potentially beyond our planet's boundaries. Since 2007 she has studied the effect of UV radiation on DNA synthesis, carbon metabolism and mutation/DNA repair in the Rift Valley of Kenya and the Bolivian Andes, and also in high altitude experiments atop Mount Everest, in balloon payloads with BioLaunch. Currently she is the principal investigator of a synthetic biology payload on an upcoming satellite mission.

Filmography 
Rothschild appeared on the 5th episode of the Youtube Original "The Age of A.I." in the episode called "How A.I. is searching for Aliens", released on January 15, 2020. She is credited as "Evolutionary and Synthetic Biology, NASA".

References

External links 
Horace Mann Medal, Brown University
Isaac Asimov Award, American Humanist Association
Profile for Solar System Exploration
Astrobiology and Space Exploration
astrobiology.nasa.gov
Profile at Brown
Course Lectures Winter 2010 on Stanford iTunes

 Part of the Silicon Valley Astronomy Lecture Series
 Motherboard, 2017

American women biologists
21st-century American biologists
Living people
Brown University alumni
1957 births
Astrobiologists
21st-century American women scientists